Jacotin or Jacob Godebrye (died 24 March 1529) was a Franco-Flemish singer and composer. From 1479 to 1528 he was a singer at Onze Lieve Vrouw (Notre Dame) in Antwerp. He was a contrapuntist, and his motets, chansons and masses were published in several extant collections. He died at Antwerp.

References

1440s births
1529 deaths
Belgian classical composers
Belgian male classical composers
Flemish composers
Musicians from Antwerp
Renaissance composers